Øvresetertjern is a lake in Oslo, Norway. From 1916 to 1938, the station Tryvandshøiden was located north of the lake, but it was never served by regular passenger trains.

References

Lakes of Oslo